Valdivia Point is a point forming both the northwest side of the entrance to Salvesen Cove and the north extremity of Pefaur (Ventimiglia) Peninsula on Danco Coast, Graham Land in Antarctica. Charted and named Valdivia Insel, after the German ship Valdivia, by the Swedish Antarctic Expedition under Nordenskjold, 1901–04. Air photos taken by the Falkland Islands and Dependencies Aerial Survey Expedition (FIDASE) in 1956-57 show the feature to be joined to the mainland.

Map

 British Antarctic Territory.  Scale 1:200000 topographic map. DOS 610 Series, Sheet W 64 60.  Directorate of Overseas Surveys, Tolworth, UK, 1978.

References
 SCAR Composite Gazetteer of Antarctica.

Headlands of Graham Land
Danco Coast